is a 22 km long Japanese aqueduct located in Tokyo.

References 

Aqueducts in Japan